Hassan Mostafa Hassan Abdel Rahman (born November 20, 1979) is an Egyptian former footballer. He played as a defensive midfielder for El Dakhleya and Egyptian national team. He is currently the assistant manager of Smouha SC.

Career

Ittihad
He began his career with Al Ahly youth team academy, Hassan can't reserve his place at Al Ahly's squad. In 2000 Hassan has joined Alexandria's giant Al-Ittihad, Hassan Spend three seasons in Al Ittihad and has called up for Egyptian national team, after that Hassan return to his home Al Ahly.

Al Ahly
In 2003, he returned to Cairo's Al Ahly. He also has many attempts on the goal, and scored 4 goals in the Egyptian League (2005–2006) for Al Ahly. He played a large role in Ahly winning the CAF Champions League 2005 and CAF Champions League 2006. He appeared for Egypt five times during their campaign in the African Cup of Nations Egypt 2006, although all his appearances were as a substitute.

Loan to Al-Wahda
In 2007, he signed a one-season loan to Saudi side Al-Wahda. scoring a goal within this season. He returned to Al Ahly and cannot to play in the starting 11 of Al Ahly, and spent all 2008–2009 season on the bench. In 2009, Ahly released him.

Zamalek
In Summer 2009, Hassan joined Al Ahly's rivals Zamalek for free and signed a three-season deal.

Honours

Club
Al Ahly
 Egyptian League: 2004–2005, 2005–2006, 2006–2007, 2007–2008, 2008–2009
 Egyptian Cup: 2006, 2007
 Egyptian Super Cup: 2005, 2006, 2007
 CAF Champions League: 2005, 2006
 African Super Cup: 2006, 2007
 FIFA Club World Cup Bronze Medalist: 2006

International
Egypt
 African Cup of Nations: 2006, 2008

References

External links

Hassan Mostafa at Footballdatabase

1979 births
Living people
Egyptian footballers
Egypt international footballers
2006 Africa Cup of Nations players
2008 Africa Cup of Nations players
Al Ittihad Alexandria Club players
Association football central defenders
Egyptian expatriate footballers
Al-Wehda Club (Mecca) players
Saudi Professional League players
Egyptian Premier League players
Egyptian expatriate sportspeople in Saudi Arabia
Zamalek SC players
Al Ahly SC players
Wadi Degla SC players
Ittihad El Shorta SC players
Ghazl El Mahalla SC players
El Dakhleya SC players